JNE may refer to:

 Jalur Nugraha Ekakurir, an Indonesian courier company
Journal of Negro Education
Journal of Nursing Education, a monthly peer-reviewed nursing journal
 National Jury of Elections (Jurado Nacional de Elecciones), a constitutional organism located in Peru